Buck Swamp is a township in northwestern Wayne County, North Carolina, United States near the city of Goldsboro and the town of Pikeville.

Education
The school system for Buck Swamp is operated by Wayne County Public Schools. The township contains Northwest Elementary School (K-5). Norwayne Middle School (6-8), is located in the nearby town of Fremont, and Charles B. Aycock High School (9-12) is located in the nearby town of Pikeville

Community
The community contains three volunteer fire departments, Little River, Nahunta, and Pikeville-Pleasant Grove. Several churches of various denominations are contained within Buck Swamp, including Pleasant Grove Original Free Will Baptist Church, Pikeville Church, Pike's Crossroads Pentecostal Holiness Church, and several other churches. There are various recreational activities to be enjoyed within Buck Swamp, including youth baseball at the Eastern Carolina Athletic Park (ECAP), kayaking along the Little River, and fishing in the many creeks, swamps, and ponds.

Industry
Businesses included in this township include Nahunta Pork Center, Benton and Son's Fabricators, a Bayer Cropscience Breeding and Trait Development Facility, and a Dollar General.

Location
The township is bordered by the Pikeville Township, which includes the Town of Pikeville, to the east and the Boon Hill Township, which includes the Town of Princeton, to the west. Other neighboring Townships include Fork Township, which includes the community of Rosewood, to the south, Stony Creek Township to the southeast, and the Great Swamp Township to the North. The southern border of the Buck Swamp Township follows the route of the Little River.

Transportation

Passenger
Air: Raleigh-Durham International Airport is the closest major airport with service to more than 45 domestic and international destinations. Wayne Executive Jetport is an airport located nearby, but is only used for general aviation. 
Interstate Highway: I-795 runs through the Buck Swamp township for approximately 3.5 miles.
Buck Swamp is not served directly by passenger trains. The closest Amtrak station is located in Selma.
Bus: The area is served by Greyhound with a location in nearby Goldsboro.

Roads
The main highways in Buck Swamp are I-795 and NC 581. Other major roads near Buck Swamp include US 117 to the east and US 70 to the south.

References

Towns in North Carolina